Digital religion is the practice of religion in the digital world, and the academic study of such religious practice.

History 
Digital Religion is the practice of religion in the digital world, and the academic study of such religious practice. Now digital religion is a modern field sub-category stemming out of digital culture. In the mid-1990s, "cyber-religion" was a term that arose to describe the interface between religion and virtual reality technologies. Most scholars started documenting how religious groups moved worship online and how religious rituals were performed. By the first decade of the 21st century, the term "digital religion" became more dominant, and has often been studied in terms of religion's developments in the Web 2.0 world. It has tended to also make a distinction between "religion online" (religious practice facilitated by the digital) and "online religion" (religious practice transforms and offers new forms of religiosity in the digital). As Heidi Campbell's work emphasizes about Digital Religion in the Digital Creatives and the Rethinking of Religious Authority it is imperative to re-frame one's spirituality in conjunction with navigating in an online community. Different religions and cultures may incorporate the use of digital mediums and religion using various reasons and practices to accomplish goals. One common theme in digital religion that they typically all have virtual religious spaces.

Virtual Christianity

The practice of engaging others in the Christian religion using virtual methods such as streaming services, mobile phone apps, social media platforms. Cyber- Christian spaces engage with people in their congregations, organizations and nonpracticers of the faith. Some use technology to hold bible studies, worship services and even as a Christian dating tool. Virtual Christianity is commonly referred to as Virtual Church instead of a direct reference to religious affiliation.  

Virtual Buddhism

The practice of engaging others in the Buddhism religion using virtual methods such as streaming services, mobile phone apps, social media platforms. Connelly, suggests that it is important to identify the positioning of Buddhists in society and in the virtual world as well. Buddhism approaches a virtual reality through an interdisciplinary approach. 

Virtual Judaism

The practice of engaging others in the Judaism religion using virtual methods such as streaming services, mobile phone apps, social media platforms. In particular the Chabad, a Jewish ultra-Orthodox movement, sheds light on a fundamentalist society interacting with new media, by negotiating between modernity and religious piety.

Virtual Hikari no Wa 

The practice of engaging others in the Hikari no Wa religion using virtual methods such as streaming services, mobile phone apps, social media platforms. Japanese New Religions Online: Hikari no Wa and Net Religion  use different forms of technology and as a result of different forms. For instance they use tech for training members and leaders, communication, broadening the reach of  their  messages, and hopefully to connect with new converts.

References 

Digital humanities
Religious studies